Conciliation is an alternative dispute resolution (ADR) process whereby the parties to a dispute use a conciliator, who meets with the parties both separately and together in an attempt to resolve their differences. They do this by lowering tensions, improving communications, interpreting issues, encouraging parties to explore potential solutions and assisting parties in finding a mutually acceptable outcome.

Conciliation differs from arbitration in that the conciliation process, in and of itself, has no legal standing, and the conciliator usually has no authority to seek evidence or call witnesses, usually writes no decision, and makes no award.

Conciliation techniques 
There is a form of "conciliation" that is more akin to negotiation.  A "conciliator" assists each of the parties to independently develop a list of all of their objectives (the outcomes which they desire to obtain from the conciliation). The conciliator then has each of the parties separately prioritize their own list from most to least important. He/She then goes back and forth between the parties and encourages them to "give" on the objectives one at a time, starting with the least important and working toward the most important for each party in turn. The parties rarely place the same priorities on all objectives, and usually have some objectives that are not listed by the other party. Thus the conciliator can quickly build a string of successes and help the parties create an atmosphere of trust which the conciliator can continue to develop.

Most successful "conciliators" in this sense are highly skilled negotiators. Some conciliators operate under the auspices of any one of several non-governmental entities, and for governmental agencies such as the Federal Mediation and Conciliation Service in the United States.

There is a different form of conciliation that, instead of a linear process of bilateral negotiation, employs deep listening and witnessing.  Conciliation literally means: "Process of bringing people together into council".  In this second definition, a conciliator is not so much focused on goals and objectives preset by the parties, but more focused on assisting parties to come together to resolve conflicts on their own.  Many people in trying to resolve conflict independently come up with solutions that turn into goals based on understanding only a portion of the whole issue.  By helping parties understand deeply where all are coming from, different and new solutions emerge from this deep understanding.  The conciliator is in service to this deep witnessing between all parties involved.    At times when two or more parties are not ready to face each other nor communicate with each other directly, the conciliator helps parties to understand their own perspective, feel more empowered to speak their truth and represent their own needs in a future dialogue with the other parties to the conflict.  The conciliator addresses any power disparities perceived by any party in a safe manner.  The ensuing dialogue in this form of conciliation can - with the parties' wishes - involve the conciliator as a facilitator until the parties feel comfortable to communicate on their own.  This form of conciliation is non-linear and involves an informal method of reconciliation between people who do not necessarily need to negotiate legal issues such as property rights or tort injuries.  It can also involve more emotional and passionate elements as tangible and historical topics emerge as the root causes of the conflict.  Most successful people who work in conciliation quietly persevere and allow the progressive movements in the parties' healing guide them.  More about this process can be found at Consulting & Conciliation Service.

Historical conciliation
Historical conciliation is an applied conflict resolution approach that utilizes historical narratives to positively transform relations between societies in conflicts. Historical conciliation can utilize many different methodologies, including mediation, sustained dialogues, apologies, acknowledgement, support of public commemoration activities, and public diplomacy.

Historical conciliation is not an excavation of objective facts. The point of facilitating historical questions is not to discover all the facts in regard to who was right or wrong. Rather, the objective is to discover the complexity, ambiguity, and emotions surrounding both dominant and non-dominant cultural and individual narratives of history. It is also not a rewriting of history. The goal is not to create a combined narrative that everyone agrees upon. Instead, the aim is to create room for critical thinking and more inclusive understanding of the past and conceptions of “the other”.

Some conflicts that are addressed through historical conciliation have their roots in conflicting identities of the people involved. Whether the identity at stake is their ethnicity, religion or culture, it requires a comprehensive approach that takes people's needs for recognition, hopes, fears, and concerns into account.

Some conflicts might be based in unmet needs for security or recognition, or thwarted development.  To learn more about the theory of basic human social needs and how they give rise to conflict, please see John Burton, Karen Horney, Hannah Arendt, and Johan Galtung to name a few.

While the above historical summary speaks to some uses of conciliation, it is not the only method and by itself cannot address the entirety of a system of protracted historical conflict.  A holistic approach to resolving deep-rooted violent conflict would ideally employ all methods of conflict resolution - education, negotiation, analysis, diplomacy, second track diplomacy, mass therapy, truth and reconciliation, cultural inventory, leadership, peer mediation/facilitation.    In short, to resolve a deeply rooted prolonged crisis, it takes all of us, coming from our strengths and positive intentions, and a willingness to allow everyone to come to the table.

For examples of applied conciliation from an historical context, look for Quaker efforts in witness and peacemaking in London, New York and South Africa.

Japan
The most common forms are civil conciliation and domestic conciliation, both of which are managed under the auspice of the court system by one judge and two non-judge "conciliators".

Civil conciliation is a form of dispute resolution for small lawsuits, and provides a simpler and cheaper alternative to litigation. Depending on the nature of the case, non-judge experts (doctors, appraisers, actuaries, and so on) may be called by the court as conciliators to help decide the case.

Domestic conciliation is most commonly used to handle contentious divorces, but may apply to other domestic disputes such as the annulment of a marriage or acknowledgment of paternity. Parties in such cases are required to undergo conciliation proceedings and may only bring their case to court once conciliation has failed.

References

Dispute resolution

pl:Ugoda